Bowmanella  is a bacteria genus from the family of Alteromonadaceae.

References

Further reading 
 
 

Alteromonadales
Bacteria genera